SS Delphine is a yacht commissioned by Horace Dodge, co-founder of Dodge Brothers. The yacht was launched on 2 April 1921 Captained by Arthur A. Archer. Power was originally supplied from three Babcock & Wilcox boilers powering two  quadruple-expansion engines.

"Of all the large American-built steam yachts built between 1893 and 1930, the Delphine is the only one left in her original condition with her original steam engines still in service."

The Delphine caught fire and sank in New York in 1926, only to be recovered and restored. She suffered further damage in 1940 when she ran aground in the Great Lakes, and was repaired. She was acquired by the United States Navy in January 1942 and rechristened USS Dauntless (PG-61), to serve as the flagship for Admiral Ernest King, Commander in Chief of the U.S. Fleet and Chief of Naval Operations. She was sold back to Anna Dodge (Horace Dodge's wife) after the conclusion of World War II and restored to civilian standards and service, including her original name.

Purportedly, U.S. President Franklin D. Roosevelt used the yacht and the Yalta accords were drafted while he was on board.

Delphine changed hands in 1967 and again in 1968, changing names again to Dauntless, only to be sold again in 1986, 1989, and in 1997 – at scrap metal prices to her next owner, Jacques Bruynooghe, who proceeded to restore her for $60 million to the original 1921 condition including interior decor and the original steam engines. She was rechristened Delphine by Princess Stéphanie of Monaco on 10 September 2003. In 2007, the ship was used as part of the setting for the Rian Johnson film The Brothers Bloom. She was acquired by her current owners in 2015 and has returned to her home port of Monaco for the 2017 charter season.

References

External links
Official site
360 degree Panoramas of The SS Delphine
Steamy superyacht has impressive pedigree, Melbourne Age 23 Jun 2010
258'/78m U.S.-Built Dodge Family Mega-Yacht is 100 Years-Old and Steam-Driven Yacht Delphine Video Xplorer Yachts via YouTube

Steam yachts
Steamships of the United States
Steamships of France
Steamships of Singapore
Steamships of Monaco
1921 ships
Ships built in Ecorse, Michigan